Home from the Hill is the first novel by author William Humphrey, published in 1958. It was made into a film two years after its publication.

References

1958 American novels
American novels adapted into films
Alfred A. Knopf books
1958 debut novels